David Scott Lascher (born April 27, 1972) is an American actor best known for his roles in Blossom, Sabrina, the Teenage Witch, and the Nickelodeon show Hey Dude.

Life and career 
Lascher was born in Scarsdale, New York to a psychotherapist mother and a lawyer father. He attended Scarsdale High School and has three sisters: Alexandra, Carly, and Lauren.

Lascher is best known for playing the lovable troublemaker Ted McGriff on Nickelodeon's comedy Hey Dude in the early 1990s. He went on to play Vinnie Bonitardi, the boyfriend of Blossom Russo, on the NBC sitcom "Blossom" from 1992 to 1993.  On Sabrina The Teenage Witch, played Sabrina's love interest Josh, a coffee shop manager and later a photographer.  On May 23, 2006, Lascher appeared on the NBC chat program Last Call with Carson Daly as a Ryan Seacrest clone in a parody of that evening's American Idol finale.

In 2014 Lascher co-wrote and produced the film Sister with Todd Camhe, which Lascher also directed. Sister premiered at the Tribeca Film Festival in 2014.

Filmography

Film

Television

References

External links 
 
 David Lascher on Myspace

1972 births
American male film actors
American male television actors
Living people
People from Scarsdale, New York
Scarsdale High School alumni